The ARIA Music Award for Best Adult Alternative Album is an award presented at the annual ARIA Music Awards. The ARIA Awards recognise "the many achievements of Aussie artists across all music genres", and have been given by the Australian Recording Industry Association (ARIA) since 1987.

To be eligible for this award the album must be of an Adult Alternative genre by solo artists and groups; only album recordings are eligible; recordings must be directed toward Adult Alternative formats; the recording cannot be entered in any other genre category. Best Adult Alternative Album is judged by a specialist judging school of representatives experienced with the genre.

Best Adult Alternative Album was first handed out in 1994. Up until 2001 it was called Best Alternative Release, which was awarded for an album or single release. From 2002 to 2009 the award was discontinued before being reinstated in 2010 under its current name. Again, from 2012 to 2015 the award was not presented until 2016 awards, the most recent ceremony.

You Am I and Regurgitator have won the most awards in this category with two each. You Am I have received the most nominations with five followed by Dirty Three, Regurgitator and Spiderbait with three and Magic Dirt, Nick Cave and the Bad Seeds and Something for Kate with two. Martyn P. Casey, Nick Cave, Warren Ellis and Jim Sclavunos have earned three nominations each as members of Nick Cave and the Bad Seeds and Grinderman. Since the award's inception only six solo acts have been nominated with one artist, Sarah Blasko, winning in 2016 for her album Eternal Return.

Winners and nominees
In the following table, the years are listed as per the ARIA Award ceremony.

References

External links

A
Album awards